The Elihu M. Harris State Office Building is a high-rise located in downtown Oakland, California. It has 22 stories and stands at 328 feet (100 m) tall.  The building is named for Elihu Harris, a former mayor of Oakland who is still living.

Offices
Offices for agencies located in the building include the San Francisco Estuary Partnership.

See also
List of tallest buildings in Oakland, California

References

External links
 Brief History of Elihu M Harris building

Government buildings in California
Government in the San Francisco Bay Area
Government buildings completed in 1998
Office buildings completed in 1998
1998 establishments in California
1990s architecture in the United States
Skyscraper office buildings in Oakland, California